Fallen Heroes is a 2007 Italian crime-drama film directed by Paolo Franchi. It entered the competition at the 64th Venice International Film Festival.

Cast 
Bruno Todeschini: Bruno Ledeux
Elio Germano: Luca Neri
Irène Jacob: Anne
Mimosa Campironi: Elisa
Maria de Medeiros: Cécile Ledeux 
Paolo Graziosi: Giorgio Neri 
Alexandra Stewart: Madre di Bruno

Production
In the sex scene that Elio Germano shot with Mimosa Campironi, the actor's erect member was in reality a prosthesis made especially for Germano by Sergio Stivaletti, already a wizard of make-up and special effects for Dario Argento.

References

External links

2007 films
Italian crime drama films
Films directed by Paolo Franchi
2007 crime drama films
2000s Italian films